Betaaj Badshah is a 1994 Indian romantic action film directed by Iqbal Durrani. The film stars Raaj Kumar, Shatrughan Sinha, Mamta Kulkarni, Jay Mehta and Prem Chopra. An audio cassette of dialogues was released.

Plot
Raja Prithviraj and his daughter, Tejeshwani live a lavish rich life. Raja is also a well respected, royalty and dangerous person when it comes to bad guys. She falls in love with Arjun Balwant Rai, son of Balwant Rai, who had kidnapped Tejeswhani as a child from his enemy Parshuram for vengeance who in turn was rescued by Raja. Parshuram too is a royal and a don similar to Raja and considers him his peer and rival. Daaga, assistant of Parshuram, however is the true villain and his son is also in love with Tejeshwani. 

Raja opposes the marriage of Tejeshwani with either Dagga's son citing his criminal background when proposed by Parshuram as peace treaty or with Arjun on account of his poverty. In the end, he kills himself seeing that his ego is the obstacle in his adopted daughter's life after Parshuram realizes that Tejeshwani is his own daughter and he accepts Arjun as atonement for his crime committed to Balwant Rai.

Characters
 Raaj Kumar as Raja Prithviraj
 Shatrughan Sinha as Parshuram / Prashanth 
 Mamta Kulkarni as Tejeshwani / Guddiya 
 Jay Mehta as Arjun Balwant Rai 
 Mukesh Khanna as Balwant Rai 
 Prem Chopra as Daaga 
 Saddam Duale as Saddu Baba
 Rakesh Bedi as Bachchu Lahiri (dance instructor) 
 Ajit Khan as Khan Chacha

Soundtrack

References

External links 
 

1990s Hindi-language films
1994 films
Films scored by Anand–Milind
Indian romantic action films